Șerban Moraru (born 9 February 1986) is a Romanian former footballer who played as a right back for teams such as Forex Brașov, Bihor Oradea, FC Brașov (1936) or Olimpic Cetate Râșnov, among others . His brother is TV host Radu Moraru.

External links
 
 

1986 births
Living people
Footballers from Bucharest
Romanian footballers
Association football defenders
Liga I players
Liga II players
Liga III players
FC Vaslui players
FC Astra Giurgiu players
SCM Râmnicu Vâlcea players
FC Bihor Oradea players
FC Brașov (1936) players
SR Brașov players